Deh Now (also known as Deh Now-e Ḩājj Abdol Beyḵ) is a village in Fazl Rural District, in the Central District of Nishapur County, Razavi Khorasan Province, Iran. At the 2006 census, its population was 157, in 37 families.

References 

Populated places in Nishapur County